Nemanja Mićević (born 28 January 1999) is a Serbian football centre-back who plays for FK Teplice.

References

External links
 
 

1999 births
Living people
Association football defenders
Serbian footballers
FK Mladost Lučani players
Talleres de Córdoba footballers
Expatriate footballers in Argentina
Serbian SuperLiga players
Serbia under-21 international footballers
Serbia international footballers
FK Teplice players
Expatriate footballers in the Czech Republic
Serbian expatriate sportspeople in the Czech Republic